George Dublin (born 11 February 1977) is an Antiguan footballer who is currently assistant coach of the Montserrat national football team.

Club career
Dublin began his career in his native Antigua and Barbuda with Hoppers FC, before moving to Trinidad and Tobago with Joe Public. He was part of the Joe Public side which won the TT Pro League title in 2006. He moved to Tobago United in 2007, but spent just one season there before returning to Antigua to play for Hoppers in the Antigua and Barbuda Premier Division.

In 2011, Dublin transferred to the new Antigua Barracuda FC team prior to its first season in the USL Professional Division. He made his debut for the Barracudas on April 17, 2011 in the team's first competitive game, a 2–1 loss to the Los Angeles Blues. He captained the team.

As of 2018, he had returned to Hoppers.

International career
Nicknamed Sowa, Dublin made his debut for Antigua and Barbuda in an April 2000 FIFA World Cup qualification match against Bermuda and has earned over 30 caps since. He played in 9 World Cup qualification games, and was part of the Antigua squad which took part in the final stages of the 2010 Caribbean Championship.

National team statistics

International goals
Scores and results list Antigua and Barbuda's goal tally first.

Coaching
Dublin holds a level 2 coaching license and established a youth soccer team.

References

External links
 

1977 births
Living people
Antigua and Barbuda footballers
Antigua and Barbuda international footballers
Association football defenders
SAP F.C. players
Joe Public F.C. players
Tobago United F.C. players
Antigua Barracuda F.C. players
TT Pro League players
Expatriate footballers in Trinidad and Tobago
Antigua and Barbuda expatriate sportspeople in Trinidad and Tobago
USL Championship players